Potsdam-Mittelmark is a Kreis (district) in the western part of Brandenburg, Germany. Its neighbouring administrative units are (clockwise from the north) the district of Havelland, the free cities of Brandenburg and Potsdam, the state of Berlin, the district of Teltow-Fläming, and the districts of Wittenberg, Anhalt-Bitterfeld and Jerichower Land in Saxony-Anhalt.

Geography
The district includes the southern banks of the Havel river and the northern parts of the Fläming (a wooded hill chain). There are three nature parks in the district: High Fläming Nature Park, Nuthe-Nieplitz Nature Park and Westhavelland Nature Park.

History
The district was created in 1993 by merging the previous districts of Belzig, Brandenburg-Land and Potsdam-Land.

Demography

Coat of arms

Towns and municipalities

References

External links

 Official website